Leo John Trese (May 6, 1902 – June 23, 1970) was an American Catholic priest, and author of spiritual books.

Education and ordination
Leo J. Trese was born in Port Huron, Michigan, on May 6, 1902. He was the last of the five children of Joseph Trese and Mary Alice Byrth.

He studied philosophy at the Assumption College of Windsor, Ontario. Later he studied theology at the Mount St. Mary Seminary, in Cincinnati, Ohio. He was ordained a priest on February 13, 1927, by Mgr. Joseph C. Plagens, at the time auxiliary bishop of Detroit.

Career
Attracted by the monastic life after having worked five years in the Roman Catholic Archdiocese of Detroit, he spent some years in the Benedictine order. In 1936 he returned to the Archdiocese of Detroit and worked in Michigan in the cities of Marysville in which he was the first pastor of St. Christopher's Parish, Melvindale, and Carleton. In 1950, as a result of his first signs of heart disease, he was appointed chaplain of the Vista Maria school in Detroit. From then on he devoted himself mostly to research and writing. In 1957 he obtained a PhD in Education at Wayne State University in Detroit. He was followed in his path as a priest by one of his nephews, John A. Trese. Leo J. Trese died on June 23, 1970.

Works 

Trese wrote more than twenty books. Those aimed at priests were well received: Vessel of Clay (1950), A Man Approved (1953) and Tenders of the Flock (1955). Some of his other works written for the general public are Many Are One (1952), Wisdom Shall Enter (1954), More Than Many Sparrows (1958), The Faith Explained (1959), Sanctified in Truth (1961), Everyman's Road to Heaven (1961), Parent and Child (1962) and You Are Called to Greatness (1964). His works have been translated into Spanish, German, French, Italian, Korean, Dutch, Polish, Japanese and Portuguese.  
For several years he wrote a weekly column, "It Seems to Me", printed in The Michigan Catholic. He also published numerous articles in different magazines.

Books by year

  Translations: Spanish:  (Currently 6 editions) Italian:  French:  Republished as:  German:  Portuguese:  Dutch: 
  Translations: Spanish:  French:  German: 
  Translations: Spanish:  Italian  German:  French:  Dutch:  Korean: 
  Translations: Spanish:  (Currently 8 editions). German:  Portuguese: 
  Translations: Spanish:  Dutch:  Italian:  German: 
  Translated into Spanish as 
 
  Translated into Spanish as 
  Translated into Spanish as 
  Translations: Spanish:  Portuguese:  Italian: 
 ; ;  Translations: Spanish:  (Currently 30 editions) Portuguese:  (Currently 10 editions) French:  Polish:  Japanese: 
  Translations: Portuguese:  (Currently 8 editions) French:  Dutch:  Italian:  
  Recently republished as  Translations: Spanish:  (Currently 16 editions) Portuguese:  Italian:  Polish:  Dutch: 
 
 
  Translations: Spanish:  Italian:  French:  Portuguese: 
 
 
 
  Translations Spanish:  (Currently 8 editions) Portuguese:  Polish: 
 
  Translated into Spanish as

Anthologies, arrangements and partial reprints 

  The book is an anthology of three works from Leo J. Trese.
  The book is an arrangement of Many are One, More than Many Sparrows and Everyman's Road to Heaven.
  The book is an edition of the first part of The Faith Explained.
  The book is an edition of the third part of The Faith Explained.

Forewords

 Foreword to 
 Foreword to

References 

20th-century American Roman Catholic priests
Roman Catholic Archdiocese of Detroit
American Roman Catholic religious writers
1902 births
1970 deaths
People from Port Huron, Michigan
University of Windsor alumni
Wayne State University alumni
Clergy from Detroit